N.S.V.Chitthan is an Indian politician of the Tamil Maanila Congress party.

Early life and background
N.S.V Chitthan was born in Tirumangalam district of Madurai on 12 April 1934. He belongs to the strong Thevar community. His father Shri N. S. Veerapathira Thevar was a member of Congress during the Pre Independence period. He married Shakuntala in 1959 . He holds a B.A. in (Economics) and studied in Madura College in Madurai, Tamil Nadu.

Entry into politics
Chithan joined Congress when he was young and contested the elections in 1967 when DMK routed Congress and managed to win even though he was contesting the elections for the first time and given the fact that there was a wave in favour of DMK.

Political base
Chithan contests from the Dindigul Parliamentary constituency. He has not been a Minister in the Union Government but has served on different committees and has been attributed to the Development of Madurai suburban localities and the transition of Road networks and Industries in Dindigul district and Madurai District.

Political timeline
 Elected to the Tamil Nadu Legislative Assembly (three times)( 1967–71 and 1980–89).
 Deputy Leader of Opposition and Deputy Leader
 Congress Legislative PartyChairman, Public Accounts Committee, Tamil Nadu Legislative Assembly( 1980–84)
 Elected to 11th Lok Sabha( 1996)
 Leader, Tamil Manila Congress (TMC) Party in Lok Sabha( 1996–97)
 Re-elected to 14th Lok Sabha (2nd term)( 2004) and Member, Committee on Transport, Tourism and CultureMember,
 Re-elected to 15th Lok Sabha (3rd term)( 2009) and Member, Committee on Personnel, Public Grievances, Law and Justice( 31 Aug. 2009)

Honours
Recipient of Silver Medal by Bureau of Parliamentary Affairs for raising maximum number (more than 7000) of Questions on the Floor of the Tamil Nadu Legislative Assembly during 1967-71 . He also addressed the UN General Assembly in 1997 as member of the Indian Delegation . He also Served as the General Secretary of Tamil Nadu Congress Committee for 2 Years .

References

1934 births
Living people
Indian Tamil people
Lok Sabha members from Tamil Nadu
India MPs 2004–2009
Indian National Congress politicians from Tamil Nadu
India MPs 1996–1997
India MPs 2009–2014
United Progressive Alliance candidates in the 2014 Indian general election
Tamil Maanila Congress politicians
People from Madurai district
People from Dindigul district
Tamil Nadu MLAs 1967–1972
Tamil Nadu MLAs 1980–1984
Tamil Nadu MLAs 1985–1989